Chris Childs may refer to:

Chris Childs (basketball) (born 1967), American basketball player
Chris Childs (bassist) (born 1959), English bass player